The Palos Verdes Public Library and Art Gallery is a historic building in Palos Verdes Estates, California. It was built in 1929–1930, and designed in the Mediterranean Revival style by architects Myron Hunt and Harold C. Chambers. It has been listed on the National Register of Historic Places since April 7, 1995.

References

National Register of Historic Places in Los Angeles County, California
Mission Revival architecture in California
Library buildings completed in 1930
1930 establishments in California